The British Mountains are a mountain range in Yukon Territory, Canada. They constitute some of the largest unglaciated mountain areas in Canada.

References 

Mountains of Yukon